Washington Group International was an American corporation which provided integrated engineering, construction, and management services to businesses and governments around the world. Based in Boise, Idaho, WGI had approximately 25,000 employees working in over 40 US states and more than 30 countries. Its primary areas of expertise were: infrastructure, mining, industrial/process, energy & environment, and power. It was acquired by URS Corporation of San Francisco in November 2007 for $3.1 billion, subsequently purchased by AECOM.

Washington Construction
At the age of 30, Dennis R. Washington founded Washington Construction Company in Missoula, Montana in 1964. He guided the company to the top of the civil construction market in Montana, and expanded into mining, industrial construction, and environmental cleanup work. As his company grew into a major regional firm, Washington's vision for the future continued to expand also - leading to a series of acquisitions that produced an international company.

In 1993 it expanded its heavy civil construction-operation, when it merged with Kasler Corporation, a California-based firm with large-scale operations in heavy-civil construction. Washington Construction Group Inc. was then based in Highland, California.

Morrison Knudsen Co.
In 1996, the much smaller Washington Construction Group merged with Morrison-Knudsen Corp. of Boise, which had been in financial difficulty.

Acquisition by URS
On May 28, 2007, URS Corporation, based in San Francisco, announced it had reached an initial agreement with WGI management to purchase the entire company for $2.6 billion (about $80 per share). According to the plan, WGI would operate as a division of URS, with the headquarters remaining in Boise. On November 15, the price was increased and finalized for a purchase price of $3.1 billion ($95.116 per share).

URS competitors include Bechtel, Fluor Corp., CB&I, Kiewit, and Jacobs Engineering Group.

URS was purchased by AECOM in 2014.

See also 
 List of locomotive builders
 Top 100 US Federal Contractors

References

 "Idaho for the Curious", by Cort Conley, ©1982, p. 403-404
 The Wreck of Morrison Knudsen - Time, April 3, 1995
 Idaho company recovers - Seattle Times, (AP), July 28, 2004

External links 
Washington Division of URS - official site
Forbes.com - URS & Washington Group - Nuclear Fusion - 29-May-2007
The Seattle Times - 29-May-2007

Defunct companies based in Idaho
American companies established in 1964
Defunct engineering companies of the United States
American companies disestablished in 2007
1964 establishments in Idaho
2007 disestablishments in Idaho